Charles Henry McKiernan (1825–1892), known popularly as "Mountain Charley," was one of the first European settlers in the Santa Cruz Mountains region of California. McKiernan was a hunter, rancher, teamster, road-builder and stage-line operator. His personal motto was allegedly: "Right wrongs nobody." Part of McKiernan's local fame was due to his disfigurement by a grizzly bear. As a consequence, "it was said of McKiernan that no grizzly would argue with him over the right-of-way on a trail, a typical tall tale that in no way detracted from McKiernan's sterling reputation."

References

External links
Mountain Charley History Tour

1825 births
1892 deaths
Irish emigrants to the United States (before 1923)
People from Santa Cruz County, California
People from Santa Clara County, California
Burials at Oak Hill Memorial Park